Shen Shengfei (born 21 January 1981 in Ningbo, Zhejiang) is a retired Chinese athlete competing in the heptathlon. She represented her country at the 2004 Summer Olympics finishing 27th. She is the heptathlon World Junior Champion from 1998.

Her personal best in the heptathlon is 6263 points from 2001.  Her 6185 score, set at the National Games of China before she turned 17, is not recognized by the IAAF as a World Youth Best, but is a superior score to the 5991 points by Tatyana Chernova that is currently recognized.

Competition record

References

1981 births
Living people
Chinese heptathletes
Athletes (track and field) at the 1998 Asian Games
Athletes (track and field) at the 2002 Asian Games
Athletes (track and field) at the 2004 Summer Olympics
Olympic athletes of China
Sportspeople from Ningbo
Athletes from Zhejiang
Asian Games medalists in athletics (track and field)
Asian Games gold medalists for China
Medalists at the 1998 Asian Games
Medalists at the 2002 Asian Games